Die Feuerengel is a German drama television series.

See also
List of German television series

External links
 

German drama television series
1997 German television series debuts
1997 German television series endings
German-language television shows
Television shows set in Hamburg
Television series about firefighting
RTL (German TV channel) original programming